Percy Williams Bridgman (April 21, 1882 – August 20, 1961) was an American physicist who received the 1946 Nobel Prize in Physics for his work on the physics of high pressures. He also wrote extensively on the scientific method and on other aspects of the philosophy of science.  The Bridgman effect, the Bridgman–Stockbarger technique, and the high-pressure mineral bridgmanite are named after him.

Biography

Early life
Bridgman was born in Cambridge, Massachusetts, and grew up in nearby Auburndale.

Bridgman's parents were both born in New England.  His father, Raymond Landon Bridgman, was "profoundly religious and idealistic" and worked as a newspaper reporter assigned to state politics. His mother, Mary Ann Maria Williams, was described as "more conventional, sprightly, and competitive".

Bridgman attended both elementary and high school in Auburndale, where he excelled at competitions in the classroom, on the playground, and while playing chess.  Described as both shy and proud, his home life consisted of family music, card games, and domestic and garden chores.  The family was deeply religious; reading the Bible each morning and attending a Congregational Church. However, Bridgman later became an atheist.

Education and professional life
Bridgman entered Harvard University in 1900, and studied physics through to his PhD. From 1910 until his retirement, he taught at Harvard, becoming a full professor in 1919. In 1905, he began investigating the properties of matter under high pressure. A machinery malfunction led him to modify his pressure apparatus; the result was a new device enabling him to create pressures eventually exceeding 100,000 kgf/cm2 (10 GPa; 100,000 atmospheres). This was a huge improvement over previous machinery, which could achieve pressures of only 3,000 kgf/cm2 (0.3 GPa). This new apparatus led to an abundance of new findings, including a study of the compressibility, electric and thermal conductivity, tensile strength and viscosity of more than 100 different compounds. Bridgman is also known for his studies of electrical conduction in metals and properties of crystals. He developed the Bridgman seal and is the eponym for Bridgman's thermodynamic equations.

Bridgman made many improvements to his high-pressure apparatus over the years, and unsuccessfully attempted the synthesis of diamond many times.

His philosophy of science book The Logic of Modern Physics (1927) advocated operationalism and coined the term operational definition. In 1938 he participated in the International Committee composed to organise the International Congresses for the Unity of Science. He was also one of the 11 signatories to the Russell–Einstein Manifesto.

J. Robert Oppenheimer, the director of the Manhattan Project, was an undergraduate student of Bridgman’s. Of his teaching abilities, Oppenheimer said that, “I found Bridgman a wonderful teacher because he never really was quite reconciled to things being the way they were and he always thought them out.”

Home life and death

Bridgman married Olive Ware (1882-1972), of Hartford, Connecticut, in 1912.  Ware's father, Edmund Asa Ware, was the founder and first president of Atlanta University. The couple had two children and were married for nearly 50 years, living most of that time in Cambridge.  The family also had a summer home in Randolph, New Hampshire, where Bridgman was known as a skilled mountain climber.

Bridgman was a "penetrating analytical thinker" with a "fertile mechanical imagination" and exceptional manual dexterity.  He was a skilled plumber and carpenter, known to shun the assistance of professionals in these matters.  He was also fond of music and played the piano, and took pride in his flower and vegetable gardens.

Bridgman committed suicide by gunshot after suffering from metastatic cancer for some time. His suicide note was a mere two sentences; "It isn't decent for society to make a man do this thing himself. Probably this is the last day I will be able to do it myself." Bridgman's words have been quoted by many in the assisted suicide debate.

Honors and awards
Bridgman received Doctors, honoris causa from Stevens Institute (1934), Harvard (1939), Brooklyn Polytechnic (1941), Princeton (1950), Paris (1950), and Yale (1951). He received the Bingham Medal (1951) from the Society of Rheology, the Rumford Prize from the American Academy of Arts and Sciences (1919), the Elliott Cresson Medal (1932) from the Franklin Institute, the  Gold Medal from Bakhuys Roozeboom Fund (founder Hendrik Willem Bakhuis Roozeboom) (1933) from the Royal Netherlands Academy of Arts and Sciences, and the Comstock Prize (1933) of the National Academy of Sciences.

Bridgman was a member of the American Physical Society and was its President in 1942. He was also a member of the American Association for the Advancement of Science, the American Academy of Arts and Sciences, the American Philosophical Society, and the National Academy of Sciences. He was a Foreign Member of the Royal Society and Honorary Fellow of the Physical Society of London.

The Percy W. Bridgman House, in Massachusetts, is a U.S. National Historic Landmark designated in 1975.

In 2014, the Commission on New Minerals, Nomenclature and Classification of the International Mineralogical Association approved the name bridgmanite for perovskite-structured , the Earth's most abundant mineral, in honor of his high-pressure research.

Bibliography

 Online excerpt.

See also 
Bridgmanite, the most abundant mineral in Earth's mantle, named after Bridgman
Bridgman's black
Pascalization, also called bridgmanization
Percy W. Bridgman House
Phases of ice, discovery of high pressure forms of water was published by P.W. Bridgman in 1912

References

Further reading 
 Walter, Maila L., 1991. Science and Cultural Crisis: An Intellectual Biography of Percy Williams Bridgman (1882–1961). Stanford Univ. Press.

External links 

 
 National Academy of Sciences Biographical Memoir
 

1882 births
1961 suicides
20th-century American physicists
American Nobel laureates
American atheists
Experimental physicists
Foreign Members of the Royal Society
Former Congregationalists
Harvard University alumni
Harvard University faculty
High pressure science
Hollis Chair of Mathematics and Natural Philosophy
Mathematicians from Massachusetts
Members of the United States National Academy of Sciences
Nobel laureates in Physics
People from Cambridge, Massachusetts
People from Newton, Massachusetts
Rheologists
Suicides by firearm in New Hampshire
Thermodynamicists
Presidents of the American Physical Society